Pokrovka is a rural locality (a village) in Tyumenyakovsky Selsoviet, Tuymazinsky District, Bashkortostan, Russia. The population was 143 as of 2010. There is 1 street.

Geography 
Pokrovka is located 20 km north of Tuymazy (the district's administrative centre) by road. Tash-Kichu is the nearest rural locality.

References 

Rural localities in Tuymazinsky District